This is a list of administrative divisions of Myanmar by Human Development Index as of 2023 with data for the year 2021.

See also
List of countries by Human Development Index

References 

Human Development Index
Myanmar
Myanmar